Beausse is a former commune in the Maine-et-Loire department in western France. The village is located between Angers and Cholet. In 2019, Beausse had 372 inhabitants.

On 15 December 2015, it was merged into the new commune Mauges-sur-Loire.

Population

See also
Communes of the Maine-et-Loire department

References

Former communes of Maine-et-Loire